Windhaag may refer to the following places in Austria:

Windhaag bei Perg
Windhaag bei Freistadt